Pascal Schmidt may refer to:

 Pascal Schmidt (born 1992), German footballer who plays as a central midfielder
 Pascal Schmidt (born 1993), German footballer who plays as a defensive midfielder